Catherine T. Nolan (born March 12, 1958) is an American politician who serves as the Deputy Speaker of the New York State Assembly. Nolan represents the 37th Assembly District, which includes the Queens neighborhoods of Sunnyside, Ridgewood, Astoria, Woodside, Long Island City, Maspeth, Queensbridge, Ravenswood, Dutch Kills and Blissville.

Nolan has lived in her district for most of her life and graduated from the St. Aloysius R.C. School and Grover Cleveland High School. She received a B.A. degree (cum laude) in political science from New York University.

She was first elected to the Assembly in 1984. Nolan is a member of the Democratic leadership in the Assembly and has served as chair of both the Labor and Banking Committee during her career. Although no longer on the Labor Committee, she has continued to push legislation which protects workers rights in New York State.

In January 2006, Nolan was appointed as chair of the Assembly Standing Committee on Education. She is also a member of the highly influential Rules and Ways & Means Committee.

She ran uncontested in the 2008 general election and won the 2010 general election with 84 percent of the vote.

Nolan resides in Ridgewood with her husband, Gerard Marsicano, and son Nicholas.

References

External links
 New York State Assembly: Catherine Nolan: 37th Assembly District
 Nolan named chairwoman of Assembly Education Committee
 New York State Democratic Committee: Assemblywoman Catherine Nolan

1958 births
Living people
Deputy Speakers of the New York State Assembly
Democratic Party members of the New York State Assembly
New York University alumni
People from Ridgewood, Queens
Women state legislators in New York (state)
21st-century American politicians
21st-century American women politicians